Aleš Depta (born 28 October 1964) is a Czech fencer. He competed for Czechoslovakia in the individual and team épée events at the 1992 Summer Olympics.

References

External links
 
 

1964 births
Living people
Czech male fencers
Czechoslovak male fencers
Olympic fencers of Czechoslovakia
Fencers at the 1992 Summer Olympics
Sportspeople from Ostrava